Koji (born Andrew Koji Shiraki, February 12, 1987, Harrisburg, Pennsylvania, United States) is an American songwriter and activist.

They signed with Run For Cover Records in August 2010 where they released a live EP entitled, Spring Song Vol. 1 and their critically acclaimed full band EP, Some Small Way. In October 2010, Koji released their first of two split releases on No Sleep Records, IIOI/KOJI. In 2011, Koji was named one of Alternative Press's "100 Bands do You Need to Know. " Never Come Undone, was released on No Sleep Records.

Since 2010, Koji has toured and performed with a wide range of artists that have included Into It. Over It., La Dispute, Never Shout Never, Code Orange Kids and also played the entirety of Warped Tour 2012.

Koji was reported to have finished tracking their debut full-length with producer, Will Yip, at Studio 4 in Conshohocken, Pennsylvania. The album personnel included long time collaborator, Brad Vander Lugt of La Dispute, on drums, as well as Matt Warner of Balance and Composure and Ned Russin of Title Fight on bass.

On December 11, 2012, it was announced that Koji would be performing as part of the Acoustic Basement tour with Geoff Rickly of Thursday, Vinnie Caruana of I Am the Avalanche/The Movielife, A Loss For Words and Brian Marquis in February 2013.

On March 26, 2021, the compilation record Sunday, Someday will be released on Get Better Records, and it features Koji, Potty Mouth, Nervus, Solstice Rey, and Full on Mone't.

Activism
Koji founded the organization COLORMAKE, as a collaborative effort between artists and activists from all over the country. In an effort to bring everyone together all artists, the organization began organizing music & gallery shows, skate & bike jams, workshops, festivals, political demonstrations and other events.

They have partnered with both creative and policy advocacy groups such as The Voice Project and RESOLVE on the issue of the LRA in Central Africa. Koji has also performed and spoken at universities in support of NPO's such as Falling Whistles.

Discography
Keeping Count 7" (February 9, 2016; The Native Sound)
Fury EP (June 16, 2015; No Sleep)
Matters EP (November 12, 2013; The Native Sound)
Crooked in My Mind (April 30, 2013; Run For Cover)
"Distance/Divide" 7" (February 2013; Run For Cover)
Never Come Undone (Split 12" w/ La Dispute; May 3, 2011; No Sleep)
IIOI/KOJI (Split 12" w/ Into It. Over It.; Nov. 23, 2010; No Sleep)
Some Small Way EP (Nov. 9, 2010; Run For Cover)
Spring Song Vol. 1 (Sept. 28, 2010; Run For Cover)

References

External links 

 

1987 births
Living people
American punk rock musicians
American musicians of Japanese descent
Musicians from Harrisburg, Pennsylvania
Run for Cover Records artists
No Sleep Records artists